Siu Om Shan is a village in Lam Tsuen, Tai Po District, Hong Kong.

Administration
Siu Om Shan is a recognized village under the New Territories Small House Policy.

References

External links
 Delineation of area of existing village Siu Om Shan (Tai Po) for election of resident representative (2019 to 2022)

Villages in Tai Po District, Hong Kong
Lam Tsuen